The Canadian Maturity Stakes was a Canadian Thoroughbred horse race run annually in late November at  Woodbine Racetrack in Toronto, Ontario. Inaugurated in 1953, the race was restricted to four-year-old horses bred in Canada. It was contested on turf over a distance of a mile and a quarter (10 furlongs).

At a time when Thoroughbreds regularly ran on both dirt and turf, the Canadian Maturity Stakes attracted the best four-year-olds in Canada. However, by the late 1980s that situation had changed dramatically and by the time of the 1994 running, it attracted a field of only four horses.

The Canadian Maturity Stakes was won for five consecutive years between 1990 and 1994 by Sam-Son Farm and Hall of Fame trainer, Jim Day. Sam-Son Farm and Day also won in 1983.

Records
Speed  record: 
 2:00.20 - Classic Reign (1993)

Most wins by an owner:
 6 - Sam-Son Farm (1983, 1990, 1991, 1992, 1993, 1994)

Most wins by a jockey:
 4 - Robin Platts

Most wins by a trainer:
 6 - James E. Day (1983, 1990, 1991, 1992, 1993, 1994)

Winners

 1996 - Dagda
 1995 - Alywow
 1994 - Desert Waves
 1993 - Classic Reign
 1992 - Dance Smartly
 1991 - Sky Classic
 1990 - Most Valiant
 1989 - Imperial Colony
 1988 - Lindjean
 1987 - Boulder Run
 1986 - Kazbek
 1985 - Nagurski
 1984 - Piper John
 1983 - Twice An Angel
 1982 - Frost King
 1981 - Bejilla
 1980 - Glorious Song
 1979 - Overskate
 1978 - Sound Reason
 1977 - Norcliffe
 1976 - Brilliant Sandy
 1975 - Rash Move
 1974 - Good Port
 1973 - Nice Dancer
 1972 - Belle Geste
 1971 - Mary of Scotland
 1970 - Jollysum Dancer
 1969 - No Parando
 1968 - Battling
 1967 - He's A Smoothie
 1966 - Good Old Mort
 1965 - Langcrest
 1964 - Albion Star
 1963 - King Gorm
 1962 - Majestic Hour
 1961 - Hidden Treasure
 1960 - Wonder Where
 1959 - Foxy Phil
 1958 - Nearctic
 1957 - Censor
 1956 - Ace Marine
 1955 - King Maple
 1954 - Chain Reaction
 1953 - Foxy Pilot

Notes

References
 June 23, 1957 New York Times article titled "Censor Is Home First In Canadian Maturity"
 July 19, 1993 Toronto Star article titled "Classic Reign zips to victory, breaks Maturity Stakes mark"

Discontinued horse races
Turf races in Canada
Woodbine Racetrack